202 (Midlands) Field Hospital is a unit of the Royal Army Medical Corps within the Army Reserve of the British Army.

History
The hospital was formed upon the formation of the TAVR in 1967, from the amalgamation of 147th (South Midland) Field Ambulance, and 22nd (Birmingham) Field Dressing Station, as the 202 (Midland) General Hospital. During the Cold War, the hospital was under the command of the 143rd (West Midlands) Infantry Brigade, however upon transfer to war, it would re-subordinate to Commander Medical 1 (BR) Corps, and provide 800 beds with support from the Warwickshire Volunteer Band. During the reforms implemented after the Cold War, the hospital was re-designated as 202 (Midlands) Field Hospital. As a consequence of Army 2020, the unit now falls under 2nd Medical Brigade, and is paired with 22 Field Hospital.

Under the Future Soldier programme, the hospital will be renamed as the 202nd (Midlands) Multi-Role Medical Regiment and fall under the 2nd Medical Group.

Current Structure
The current structure of the hospital is as follows:
Headquarters, at Roger Nutbeem House, Birmingham
A Detachment, at Baskeyfield House, Stoke-on-Trent
B Detachment, at Roger Nutbeem House, Birmingham
C Detachment, at Bligny House, Shrewsbury

References

Units of the Royal Army Medical Corps
Military units and formations established in 1967